Over the years, the Tamiya Corporation has created a huge number of notable product lines. This article attempts to list them.

Radio-controlled vehicles

Cars (1/12 scale)
The first radio-controlled car to be released by Tamiya was a Porsche 934 in 1976. Its body was based upon an existing 1/12 scale static kit that Tamiya had already been manufacturing, so the effect was that of a traditional static model kit with the added ability to be radio-controlled – something Tamiya acknowledged, as all of their early kit boxes carried the wording "suitable for radio control". The Porsche 934 was a massive hit – selling over 100,000 units in its first year. The potential market for easy to assemble electric radio-controlled model cars was clear and the 934 was soon followed by a kit of the Porsche 935.
Lamborghini Countach LP500S (CS), the eighth car to be released by Tamiya (58008). Although released previously (58005) this model is the first to use the Competition Special tag, meaning that it is a hopped-up (Hop-up meaning more powerful or souped-up) version. The early models came equipped with the more powerful RS540 unit, as opposed to the standard RS380S, and sponge/diplo tyres, which were later adopted by competition cars of that size as opposed to rubber. It also featured a thicker chassis with different cast metal steering.
Can-Am Lola RM1, based on the T333 that Jacky Ickx used to win the reformatted Can-Am series in 1979. This was Tamiya's further foray into building competition cars, hence the RM (Racing Master) tag that appeared on the box, the first of seven cars. The car did feature a few groundbreaking innovations that became common in other RC cars, these were the introduction of the first hop-up RC motor the Mabuchi Black RS-540SD, fully adjustable flex/tweak chassis (including adjustable castor & ackerman, bulletproof ball raced sealed rear diff.), over-engineered sophisticated step-less MSC with microswitch and braking, to use the BEC radio gear and to come fully ball raced. It was the first Tamiya car to use a polycarbonate body shell rather than the heavier and fragile moulded ABS of the previous cars. This was soon followed by the release of the Datsun 280ZX RM Mk2, a model of the car driven by Paul Newman to win the SCCA CP title. A narrower redesigned version of the RM chassis with the same axle/drivetrain/steering components as the RM1, but minus the MSC, diff, bearings and RS-540SD Motor; all which can be fitted in as an option.
Tornado RM. Mk3, released two years after the first RM model, leading to an upsurge in the market for the 1/12 scale pan racers, which by then many companies including Associated, Schumacher, Delta, Kyosho, and ABC had become involved in the market. As a result, Tamiya redesigned the RM's pan chassis reducing its weight by leaving out some of the less-used items that were offered in the RM1. Other adjustments were that the RM3 could accept the 7.2V stick packs and an uprated adjustable mechanical speed controller, known as the SuperChamp MSC. The RM3's steering arrangement had returned to the simpler setup with an adjustable caster. The body shape would become common with RC cars throughout the decade. Tamiya's further evolution with the RM5/6 (Porsche 956 and Toyota 84C) would be another all-new design featuring a stiffening top plate and a floating rear pod with a single spring.
The Porsche 959, released in 1986 was a 1/12 scale radio-controlled replica of the car that won the 1986 Paris Dakar Rally and was one of the most complex and highly detailed R/C model kits ever made. It was soon followed by the Toyota Celica Gr.B, a replica of the Safari Rally winner, which shared the same chassis as the Porsche 959 but included several upgrades such as a third differential in the centre of the car and a much needed front anti-roll bar, making it an even more complex kit.

Cars (1/10 scale)

Williams FW07 (CS), although not the first F1 car to be released, as well as being the second to use the CS (Competition Special) banner, further changes would be made with its release. As well as having the standard equipment found on all CS models the main chassis is single deck FRP rather than the single deck aluminium of early versions, the motor mount is a lighter pressed alloy instead of heavy cast alloy as well as front uprights of nylon instead of alloy and a rear motor pod of stamped metal plate instead of cast metal. Examples can fetch almost US$1000.The SRB line of off-road buggies began in 1979 starting with the Rough Rider, than the Sand Scorcher, followed by the Ford Ranger. These vehicles featured a scaled down version of the Volkswagen Beetle chassis used on many desert racing buggies. The final SRB to come along in 1983 was the Super Champ. The Super Champ was unique from the other SRBs due to its use of a rear "mono -shock" design. Aside from the SRB line were the Hilux and Blazing Blazer 3 speed 4 wheel drives both released in 1982. The original Wild Willy kit was revised in 1985 to give it a slightly longer wheelbase leaving the earlier, shorter wheelbase version quite hard to find. Wild Willy 2 was released in 2000 utilizing a pre-assembled Wild Dagger gearbox and tires from Lunch Box, but otherwise a wholly new mechanical design. Wild Willy 2 retained the Jeep body with only a few minor differences, such as horizontal front grill slits instead of the vertical slits of the original. There has also been a metallic edition of Wild Willy 2.
The Subaru Brat was released in 1982. It was a two-wheel-drive off-road radio-controlled buggy that was both fast and much lighter than its predecessors. This model also marked a new balance between the use of metal and plastic components. The chassis of the Brat was used for the basis of the Frog, Black Foot, and Monster Beetle.
The Frog, released in 1983, was an improvement on the previous year's Brat release. It featured an updated differential, ball bearings, oil shocks, and a lighter polycarbonate body. The Frog was very popular and marked the beginning of Tamiya's use of animal themes to draw inspiration for its vehicle designs and colours – an idea that proved extremely popular and which was continued through several kits. The Frog kit was also re-released in 2005, though with a few alterations such as more reliable dog bone type universal shafts and an Electronic Speed Controller. The Frog's lower price and weight (compared to the earlier Rough Rider), began the 1/10 scale offroad racing phenomenon. However, its role in racing was limited with the release the following year of the Team Associated RC10.
The Grasshopper, released in 1984, was a two-wheel-drive off-road radio-controlled buggy. It was very rugged and featured a simple construction and was Tamiya's most affordable buggy. It featured a bathtub chassis holding a simple rigid axle in the rear and single wishbone front suspensions in the front. Its 380-sized motor meant it was among Tamiya's slower models at the time, though its lighter ABS plastic bathtub chassis helped put its speed only a little behind that of the earlier, heavier Special Racing Buggies. It was also much more economical on batteries and overall it was the ideal off-roader for the first-time hobbyist which also made it very popular. The Grasshopper kit was re-released in 2005 with a few alterations.
The Hornet, released in 1984, was a two-wheel-drive off-road radio-controlled buggy which was quite fast and rugged. It shared most components with the Grasshopper, though it was faster and lighter due to a polycarbonate (Lexan) body. It would go on to become one of the most popular R/C kits of all time and was re-released in December 2004 with a few alterations. There was also a sequel, the Super Hornet, which was released in 1994 and was still being manufactured exclusively for the Australian market until 2006, making it one of the longest-running Tamiya kits in history.
The Thunder Shot, Released in 1987, was a four-wheel-drive buggy. The Thunder Shot was the first Tamiya Buggy to be released as a 'Complete Kit'. Only two of the First 100 were released as a complete kit. It included an ADSPEC Controller and Servo inside the box which had the 58067 model. This was bundled as model 57001. The Sonic Fighter was 57002. Both were introduced in the Tamiya yearly catalogue for the first time in the 1988 issue shown as complete kits. For the 1989 issue and every issue until they were no longer available in 1991 the Thunder Shot was always pictured and shown only in the 58067 form. The complete kit was only available for the first production run and was discontinued mid-1988. Generally, most collectors do not know of the Thunder Shot 'complete kit'. With only a couple left in the world that have not been built, it makes the unbuilt Thunder Shot 'complete kit' one of the most prized models to find for a collector. Especially seeing only two of the first 100 were ever released in this form with a much bigger box to house the 58067 and the ADSPEC controller and Servo.
 The Hotshot, released in 1985, Tamiya's first four-wheel-drive off-road buggy. It broke new ground for Tamiya and also enthusiasts, and was the car to beat in 1/10-scale buggy racing when it was released.  It featured four-wheel independent double-wishbone suspension, a unique mono-spring suspension that used only two springs for the entire four wheels.  For its time, the car was light, rugged and upgradeable. In the years that followed parts of the Hotshot were evolved and reused in several other 4WD buggy models including the Hotshot 2 (which was identical aside from simpler direct rear suspension), the Boomerang, the Super Sabre and Tamiya's 10th Anniversary car, the Bigwig. In 2007 the Hotshot was re-released. An ESC is included instead of a mechanical speed controller and the body has a metal patch functioning as a heatsink to dissipate heat from the ESC, dog-bone shafts are simplified, Hexa bolt and Hexa cup universal for connecting front and rear gearboxes are discarded and a simpler dog-bone shaft is adapted. Because of ESC the original heatsinks on resistors for the mechanical speed controller are no longer necessary but are included as dummies as they are unique to the Hotshot. Other parts and designs are identical. Unfortunately, there remain some minor problems with Hotshot: bump steer, the front wishbones rubbing on the inside of the front wheels and the front spring's attachment point to the lower wishbones being weak.
 The Bruiser 1/10-scale radio-controlled pickup truck, released in 1985, had a working three-speed transmission which could be shifted via radio control, a high-torque RS-750SH motor and an ultra-realistic Toyota Hilux body with a sleeper cab and interior detail.  The steel frame, leaf suspension, front, and rear axle and steering were patterned after their full-sized counterparts. This complex model has since become one of the most collectibles of all Tamiya R/C cars. It featured a mechanically shiftable 3-speed transmission, using a 3rd radio channel. It would run in 4x4 mode in the lowest gear only. No other RC car or truck of the time offered shiftable mechanical transmission making it highly realistic.
 The original Blackfoot monster truck kit and its variations, first released in 1986, was credited with much of the hobby's growth. The Blackfoot line included the original Blackfoot, Super Blackfoot, and King Blackfoot, all sharing the same ORV spaceframe chassis first used in Frog but featuring some improvements. The Blackfoot Extreme used the chassis from the Wild Dagger. The Blackfoot was a Ford F-150 despite its inspiration being drawn from the real Bigfoot monster truck which was a Ford F-250. The Monster Beetle, now a very collectible model, was nearly identical to the Blackfoot with the addition of gold wheels, oil-filled shocks and of course the Volkswagen Beetle bodyshell.
 Vanessa's Lunchbox, actually a 1/12-scale kit due to its monster truck design and short wheelbase, was released in 1987. It made use of the strong Grasshopper/Hornet gearbox and had an exceptionally detailed hard body shell of a Dodge van, heavily inspired by the real monster truck Rollin' Thunder. It was a "fun" vehicle, having poor stability and performing long wheelies, and in many respects was therefore similar to real monster trucks of the (then) future. This also made it one of the more popular models and it was re-released in 2005 with only minor modifications. A metallic gold edition followed in 2007.
 Midnight Pumpkin is a sister truck to the Lunchbox that used the same chassis, gearbox, suspension, and tyres. It was also based on a real monster truck, Frankenstein, although the model was mostly black instead of the yellow worn by the real truck. In early 2006, a metallic chrome edition was released.
 The Clod Buster 1/10-scale radio-controlled monster truck was released in 1987 as the first Tamiya R/C monster truck with two drive motors, four-wheel drive, and four-wheel steering. Each of the front and rear axles were identical, and the motor is attached to the axle itself, making it a very simple design.  This simple design allowed the axles to be used in modified vehicles. The Clod Buster spawned an aftermarket industry of its own that catered to those who wished to modify their models to "crawlers", specialized vehicles designed to climb steep and rugged surfaces. The Clod Buster has remained popular since its introduction and produced the Super Clod Buster. The Clod Buster was also released with a detailed semi-truck body, as the Bullhead. The Clod Buster still has a large aftermarket following with many companies designing parts for rock crawling as well as trailer pulling and racing. The main reason for its continued use is its ultra-strong gearboxes.
 The Avante, released  in 1988. This was a car specifically designed to return Tamiya to the forefront of R/C racing. Its unique design featured an FRP chassis, aluminium components everywhere and almost limitless adjustments. Unfortunately, it was somewhat over-engineered – The car was too heavy, too fragile, dynamically inept, and uncompetitive. However, it is still a highly desirable model to a Tamiya collector because of the unique and uncompromising engineering that went into it.
 The Egress is the follow-up to the Avante, with material that was advanced for the time. Unlike the Avante, it has simplified suspension and a longer wheelbase arrangement that was seen in Vanquish/Avante2001.The avante drivetrain is carried forward except with ball diffs F/R and one-way bearing in the middle. Like the Avante it was a no expense is spared car, it even came with Platinum hi-cap dampers, a full set of blue-rubber-sealed bearings, graphite chassis plates and towers, alloy hardware and titanium screws.
 The Astute was Tamiya's first attempt to build a serious 2WD competition car. The car came equipped with everything that was needed to make the car competitive including ball diff, ball-raced gearbox, oil-filled dampers at each corner, front anti-roll bar and all adjustable suspension geometry. The unusual step of installing metal bushes in all suspension pivot points was taken, which reduces the amount of slop in the suspension due to flexing and slows down the rate of wear in these joints. Although fully adjustable this did add extra weight and complexity and it may be for these reasons that it was never very widely used on the racing scene. Jamie Booth did win the European championship in 1991 with a modified and simplified Astute with parts from Tamiya Madcap. Some of his modifications were later found on the Super Astute which addressed many of the faults of its predecessor.
The Nissan Skyline GT-R Nismo was a TA-01 chassis kit (packaged with an R32 GT-R body) released in 1991. The TA-01 chassis was derived from the Manta Ray buggy with shorter arms, narrower wheels and radial tires. This kit wasn't the first TA-01 kit (which was the Toyota Celica GT-Four Rally), nor was the TA-01 the first chassis to be designed to be fitted with a touring car body (as there had been body kits that were designed to fit into buggies). Due to its popularity, this Skyline GT-R kit was credited for creating the touring car craze during the early 1990s as well as the chassis introducing the one-make low-cost racing known as the Tamiya Racing Championship.
The TR-15T was one of the first gas-powered stadium trucks to be released on the market. Unfortunately, the TR-15T was not a commercial success and was discontinued quickly. Nowadays the car is one of the more collectible RC models commanding over $450 in a mint boxed unopened condition.
The Juggernaut was an attempt to create a true monster truck, bigger than any previously attempted in the R/C world. It featured 4×4 and four-wheel steering with a tire diameter of 6.5 inches (16.5 cm) and weighing one pound (0.45 kg) each. It remains as one of the biggest and failures in Tamiya's history. It featured two rigid axles but, unlike Clod Buster, two motors were located in the central gearbox in tandem. From the central gearbox two universal shafts connected to the front and rear axles. Its massive weight of 4.5 kg, combined with low gear ratios necessary to provide enough torque to move the monster, would simply destroy the bevel gears in the axle in one run. Tamiya quickly revised many parts: The bevel gears in the axle received reinforcements of more bearings and lower gear ratios.  Released in 1999 Juggernaut would have received a prominent feature in the 2000 Tamiya Catalog signaling that Tamiya was back in monster trucks after the 13 years since Clod Buster. Due to its catastrophic failure Juggernaut is not featured in any of the yearly catalogs at all. Instead, the revised and re-colored Juggernaut 2 appears in the 2001 catalog along with the Mammoth, a Juggernaut 2 based Mammoth Dump truck. Juggernaut 2 and Mammoth both retained the complex link suspension and leaf springs that did not allow adequate articulation, giving them a very bouncy ride.
The TXT-1 (Tamiya Extreme Truck) 1/10 scale radio control monster truck was released in 2002. The axles and gears are almost entirely identical to Juggernaut 2, with slightly bigger diameter universal shafts. With TXT-1 Tamiya engineers shifted attention from simply building a massive monster truck to a very capable rock crawler. This truck, which is still in production, was designed as a factory response to aftermarket Clodbuster upgrades. Four-wheel drive and cantilever multi-link suspension allow for the axle articulation featured in third party kits such as the Clodzilla series. The new truck dispensed with the unreliable four-wheel steering of Juggernaut 1 and 2's single under-powered servo sat in the center of the vehicle. Instead, the TXT would mount one servo to steer the front wheels only. As an option, the rear axle can also mount a servo allowing all 4 wheels to steer. Tamiya engineers attended USHRA monster truck events in order to improve the scale appearance of the TXT and duplicate full-size suspension designs. Having fixed all the Juggernaut's suspension problems and with improved chassis and steering it remains one of the most capable crawlers.
The TRF414 series radio-controlled cars was holder of the 2002–04 IFMAR ISTC 1/10-scale electric touring car world champion title. The TRF414 was created in response to Tamiya's customer demands for a more adjustable and efficient touring car than the TA03. It was the first Tamiya touring car to depart from the previous gear-driven layouts used in the TA01/02 and TA03, instead employing two unequal-length belts to transmit the power to all four wheels with only one geared step. The TRF414M2 was a popular touring car due to its low cost relative to other cars in its class.
The TRF415 holder of the 2004–06 IFMAR ISTC 1/10-scale radio-controlled electric touring car world champion title.
 The TA01/TA02 chassis series from the early-mid-1990s were sold with various body shells. The TA01 was based on Tamiya's Manta Ray buggy and was one of the first kits on the market to be sold with a realistic body coupled with a capable, easy-handling 4WD chassis. Some of these body shells are among the most realistic and detailed lexan bodies ever made by any manufacturer. Models worthy of note are the E30 BMW M3, W201 Mercedes 190E 2.5–16 Evolution-II, Ford Escort RS Cosworth and the Lancia Delta Integrale. Tamiya re-released the bodies recently, either sold separately or bundled with a TT-01 kit.
The TL-01/TL-01LA/TL-01B/TL-01RA chassis, released from the mid-'90s to the late '90s, was an innovative shaft-driven 4WD touring chassis with a narrow three-piece vertically sandwiched chassis design. Its characteristics include high durability and low cost, making it an excellent starting car for beginners. Like the TA01/TA02 it was released with many different rally, touring and sports car bodies and incorporated various minor modifications throughout its production run. Tamiya released the TL-01 with modified with long arms and buggy size wheels to as the TL-01B marketed as the Baja Champ and later Baja King buggies. The TL-01 remains one of the more popular Tamiya chassis today.
 The TLT-1 is a small truck of about 1/15 scale.  It is a scaled-down version of TXT-1. Light weight and TXT-1 style suspension system makes it a very capable little climber. It has quickly become widely known as one of the most versatile RC cars for projects for scale rock crawling, a hobby that is starting to make itself noticed by the general RC market. Like the Clod Buster, its axles are highly desirable.
Nitro Thunder is a 4×4 buggy powered by a .15 glow engine. It utilizes an off-road racing buggy chassis called NDF-01. Just as TNX has shown promise in racing circuits the NDF-01 is a smaller 1/10 sized off-road racer. Use of a resin tub chassis, instead of aluminum, and a frontal impact control system that absorbs shocks from a collision indicate that Nitro Thunder is built with young racers in mind. Adjustability of the suspension, rear exhaust and full ball bearings are features often found in models for experienced racers. Just as Kyosho offers scaled-down 1/10 buggy of their 1/8 buggies for inexperienced racers Nitro Thunder is Tamiya's entry into the 1/10 buggy market. Nitro Blaster is an identical buggy with different exterior.
The Ford F-350 High Lift, released in 2006, is a modernized version of the vintage three-speed trucks, such as the Bruiser and Mountaineer. A three-speed gearbox from the tractor trailer truck series mounts on steel chassis rails, with leaf springs and grease friction dampers supporting it on modified TLT axles. The truck is finished with a detailed hard body version of the Ford F-350, very similar to the earlier Juggernaut's body. It is a very capable crawler in its own right and a sister truck, with a Bruiser (Toyota Hilux) body was released in Dec 200, with a scale surf board as an accessory.
The TA05, released in spring 2005, is the replacement for the TRF414-derived TA04 line of touring cars. The chassis is a clean-sheet design featuring a twin-belt drivetrain utilizing two equal-length belts, a center-mounted motor and a low layshaft, resulting in a nearly 50/50 front–back weight distribution. The car is very popular with touring car racers due to its ease of set-up and its relatively low-maintenance drivetrain. Tamiya marketed the TA05 with various sports and racing car bodies and Tamiya also released the TA05-IFS (Inboard Front Suspension) along with the limited-edition TA05MS (Maezumi Satoshi), and the hopped-up TA05R (containing the most popular TA05 upgrades) in spring 2007. The IFS features an inboard front suspension with pushrod-activated laydown shocks (as opposed to standup shocks attached directly to the suspension arm), which is a first for a 1/10 scale electric mainstream touring car. The chassis can be bought with various low-slung bodies such as the Vemac RD350 body in Ebbro Team Nova's livery (who participated in the GT300 class in the 2007 JGTC), the GT500 Lexus SC430 (in various liveries), and the 2007 Raybrig NSX.

Tamtech 
Tamtech, released in 1986, is a series of smaller radio controlled cars which can be quickly assembled and driven, powered by a 7.2v battery. The first two cars released were the Porsche 962 followed shortly by the Lancia LC2. Seven 1/24 cars have been released with the other five being: BMW GTP, Ford Mustang Probe, Ferrari Testarossa, Porsche 961 and Lamborghini Countach 5000QV. Tamiya turned next to 1/14 F1 cars releasing only three: Ferrari 643, Lotus 102B and McLaren MP4/6. Finally one 1/18 monster truck, Max Climber, was made before the Tamtech line was dropped in favor of the QD ready to run cars. In 1988 Tamiya released a scale model of the Porsche 962 using the Tamtech body, however accurate, many model builders and enthusiasts of the Group C/IMSA GTP racer cited the rear bulk of the engine hatch is bigger than that of the full-sized counterpart. Much of the car's lack of real success was because the popularity of the large sized counterpart meant that there were very little demand for small-scale RC cars. The Tamtech cars would later influence other RC car manufacturers including Kyosho to build miniature RC cars, such as their own highly successful Mini-Z series and RadioShack's popular XMODS.

RC Gliders 
Tamiya offers a couple of Radio Controlled gliders with wingspans around 6 ft. (2 metres). Peak Spirit has a foldable propeller that can be deployed when necessary. Alt Stream is an unpowered RC glider.

Quick Drive 
The QD (Quick Drive) Series are 1:14 scale pre-built and simplified versions of Tamiya's 1/10 scale RC cars and trucks. This series was introduced in 1988 with the Thunder Shot QD aimed at bringing the joys of RC racing to children. The models were pre-assembled and supplied ready-to-run with radio gear, batteries and charger all included and featuring a two-speed gearbox. The range included versions of the Midnight Pumpkin, Super Sabre, Manta Ray and Monster Beetle.

Solar powered cars 
Tamiya, as well as building solar powered educational models, also built the first solar powered radio controlled car called the Solar Eagle SRC-6000.

Trucks and trailers (1/14 scale) 
Tamiya produces 1/14 scale radio controlled trucks using ABS body shells. The trucks 540-size electric motor/3-speed transmission-combination is powerful enough to tow an adult behind the truck on a skateboard.

Available in the current truck range are the following rigs:
 King Hauler  (also available in a pre-painted black edition)
 Globeliner
 Mercedes-Benz 1838LS
 Mercedes-Benz 1850L (distribution truck)
 Volvo FH12 Globetrotter 420
 Ford AeroMax (also available in a limited chrome edition)
 Knight Hauler (also available in a limited chrome edition)
 Scania R-series R 470 Highline (also available in a chrome edition and a pre-painted orange edition)
 Scania R-series R 620 Highline 
 MAN TGX 18.540 XLX (also available in a pre-painted red edition)
 MAN TGX 26.540 XLX
 Mercedes-Benz Actros 1851 GigaSpace
 Freightliner Cascadia Evolution
 Grand Hauler
 
The truck range also includes some 2 axle trailers "North American style":
 Flatbed trailer (the basic flat trailer)
 Box trailer (closed cargo trailer)
 Tank trailer (liquid transport)
 Pole trailer (wood/tree transport)

Tamiya also offers 3 axle "Euro type" semi-trailers in their regular line-up.

 European Type 3 Axle Reefer Semi Trailer
 European Type 3 Axle 40 ft Intermodal container Semi-Trailer (with authentic "Maersk" container graphics)

In addition, sound and lighting options are available for the trucks and semi-trailers both from Tamiya and aftermarket manufacturers. 
Tamiya's original light- and soundkit is the "MFU", a plug-and-play module specifically designed for their line of trucks but unfortunately this unit is very old, inaccurate and clumsy compared to those available from aftermarket manufacturers such as the Servonaut brand from German Tematik.

Aftermarket manufacturers also offer a complete range of various conversion kits, including hydraulic accessories, new cabs, cab alterations, add-on details, new lights of all kinds, sound as mentioned above, and all kinds of tailored accessories from which the user can change his truck into either a truck he's seen streetside or the truck of his dreams.

All around the world different clubs form to make "dioramas" that suits the 1/14-scale which they use as social gathering points and to challenge and admire other user's rigs and driving skills, and these clubs are rapidly expanding all the way from Asia through Europe to America with members of all ages.

Tanks (1/16 scale) 

Tamiya's radio controlled tanks have options such as sound, light and optional parts to depict different variants.

 M4 Sherman 105 mm
 Leopard 1A4
 Flugabwehrkanonenpanzer Gepard
 German Tiger II, Production Turret
 German Tiger II – Porsche Turret
 Tiger I Early Production
 M26 Pershing T26E3
 Leopard 2A6
 German Panther tank G
 Jagdpanther

The Leopard A4 and Flakpanzer Gepard are no longer produced; updated versions of the others have some technical and cosmetic innovations over the original models.
Also the non-multi function models of the Tigers and Sherman are not made any more.

The latest models  (Full Option Kits) have full sound function, fire simulation (barrel moves when fired), the latest Full Option Tank (Leopard 2A6) has an upgrade part available, a barrel stabiliser which keeps the cannon level even with the tank moving.

Also there is a battle function unit for sale, so you can actually fight a tank battle with another Tamiya battle function equipped 1/16 tank.

These tanks utilize standard RC modules such as receivers, transmitters and servos that are same as those used in RC cars, trucks, boats, airplanes and helicopters.

Yachts (1/20 scale)
Tamiya produced a series of 1/20 scale which are highly realistic. These include:
 Yamaha Round the World
 Yamaha 40EX
 36 Class R/C Racing Yacht Innovator

Track racing cars
The Mini 4WD and Dangun-Racer series are small (1/32 scale) single-motor (130-size) free-operating electric models designed to operate using two AA-sized batteries and run on a special deeply channeled track.

Static-display scale models

Tamiya held an arguable lead in the static plastic model market for many years and competed with other classic brands like Revell and Airfix, but recently Chinese makers such as Dragon (DML) and Trumpeter are offering fierce competition.

Military Vehicles (1/35 and 1/48)

The oldest category in Tamiya's export line has been the "Military Miniatures" series of 1:35 scale figures and vehicles. The series has focused on World War II military subjects, though a growing minority of kits in this line come from later periods. The collection of German vehicles is especially strong.

The products are characterized by striking full colour paintings on the boxtops. Tamiya moulds are generally quite clean and almost no flash is found on their products. It was Tamiya themselves that established the use of 1/35 scale for military models. The scale was the result of the design of their first tank kit, the motorized Panther tank, being designed just large enough to contain the motor assembly and battery pack.

In addition to vehicles themselves the category includes soldiers, weapons sets and scenery items (e.g., brick walls, signs, barricades) for use in dioramas.

In the 1990s Dragon (DML) kits used to be generally inferior to Tamiya. Dragon's quality has improved and they have elected to compete in the high quality end of the market offering photo etched parts, aluminum barrels, individual track links, and upwards of 500 parts. Another Chinese maker, Trumpeter is also competing from lower end of the market. Tamiya's kits use vinyl tracks but Tamiya's recent inclusion of two kinds of tracks (vinyl and molded plastic) suggest that Tamiya is following the trend set by other manufacturers. As Trumpeter's quality improves, Tamiya's static military lines are being pressured from both the high end and the low end.

Tamiya has found a niche market of 1/48 scale military miniatures, designed as a smaller alternative to the larger 1/35 kits. As the average Japanese house is smaller than those amongst other nations, smaller kits that can be neatly put into smaller kit boxes after assembly and stored away are proven to be more popular by necessity. Utilizing the specifications of their 1/35 kits, many parts in 1/48 scale kits are simply scaled-down versions of their 1/35 counterpart, with a notable exception of tracks being molded in plastic in 1/48, instead of somewhat less detailed vinyl tracks often seen in 1/35 kits. Starting in 2004, early kits from this series featured metallic chassis, which served to add weight to the models of this smaller scale. Tamiya has put out an average of 1 new kit a month since the launch of the series as a way of blocking entry into the 1/48 scale market for Chinese makers. As of 2015, over 80 models are available from Tamiya in 1/48 scale, representing mainly the popular World War II tanks and vehicles. HobbyBoss, another Chinese maker, offers 1/48 tanks with full interior details for about the same price.

In the traditional 1/35 scale military miniature market Tamiya is offering innovations such as  suspensions made to articulate using real springs. However these offerings are not substantial or unique enough to give Tamiya the clear dominance it once had in the static miniature market. More over many Chinese model makers offer numerous outstanding kits every year which pressures Tamiya's static 1/35 line. Because of their visibility as a leader Tamiya can highlight obscure vehicles that no other makers are willing to build. The Sturmtiger 38 cm, for example, was an obscure vehicle and only a handful of the massive mortar tanks were built in real life but Tamiya still introduced it to the market.  Although numerous and powerful the Char B was not a very glamorous tank and no other major maker was willing to invest in it. In this role of supporting more obscure models Tamiya manages a wide-ranging product line and so continues to lead the market.

Aircraft

Their line of static model aircraft, primarily in 1/48 scale, are widely considered to be state-of-the-art. The 1990s release of the Spitfire, for example, had great ease of construction and attention to detail with the new molds having very fine raised details.

Many of the same aircraft have been repeated in 1/72 scale to a similar standard, with a few subjects only available in this scale. Within Japan the  1/72 scale line includes a large number of re-badged Italeri kits, which are priced significantly lower than Tamiya originals.

Tamiya is also one of the few manufacturers of 1/100 scale aircraft. Originally called the 'Minijet Series, consisting of jet fighters plus a B-52, it was terminated in the 1980s but revived in 2004 and renamed the Combat Jet Series.

Tamiya used to produce a few 1/32 scale kits.

In aircraft models Tamiya offers a few clear skinned kits showing interior parts of aircraft. A few motorized kits are available also which feature spinning props. Some kits even include sound effect modules. Tamiya's aircraft kits often include metal weights that prevent the aircraft from sitting on their tails. Compared to other kits such as Hasegawa, where the builder has to glue in bearings or fishing line weights, Tamiya's kits are convenient.  Some kits produced recently can be made with detachable wingtips and landing gears.  They also come in a box that can be turned into a raised box that could safely house the finished model after its completion.  These gimmicks and often cleverly designed simpler construction help Tamiya stay on top of the miniature aircraft market.

As with many other Japanese model makers dealing with WWII weapons Tamiya also prefers to focus on Japanese weapons first, due to the considerable size of the Japanese domestic market: The 1/48 scale P-47 Thunderbolt, one of the most famous WWII fighters, has been produced only recently, while the Hellcat, an American naval fighter, is yet to be produced. The Japanese Zero fighter was the first to be produced in 1/48 scale and the first prop fighter added to the larger 1/32 scale in 2006 is once again the Japanese Zero.

In 2009, Tamiya introduced its 1:32 scale Supermarine Spitfire Mk. IXc, and North American Aviation P-51D Mustang  model kits.
These were soon accompanied by the Spitfire Mk. VIII and XVI variants, and a further P-51K variant in the same scale.

Tamiya designed the models with great attention to detail, and went so far as to include a complete scale models of the fighter's Rolls-Royce Merlin 66 engine. Innovative features of the models include the need to build and mount the scale Merlin to allow the fitment of magnet-held detachable engine cover panels; The option post-construction of displaying the model with retracted or extended undercarriage; and the inclusion of an incredibly fine and very well detailed cockpit.

Reviews of the Spitfire and Mustang found little to fault with the kits. Model building reviewers have praised the kit of the Spitfires in particular for their fidelity of form, and near-completeness of execution. The model's complexity and detail even gave rise to publications devoted explicitly to their construction and finishing.

In 2014, Tamiya followed the single engined fighters with the 1:32 scale DeHavilland Mosquito FB.IV. This also makes of the Merlin Engine model included in the earlier single engined fighters, as well as an equally detailed interior. It met with similar critical acclaim to that of the Spitfire and P-51D models,  and also gave rise to book publication specific to its completion by modellers.

Automobiles
They produce many model car kits including road cars, sports racing cars, World Rally Championship cars, and Formula One racing cars. Usually these are 1/24 scale although the Formula One kits are 1/20 scale. A few street, racing, and F1 kits are also produced in 1/12 scale including the Ferrari 641/2, McLaren Honda MP4/6, and Williams Renault FW14B.

The cars in the 1:20 Grand Prix Collection in order of manufacture are:

Tyrrell P34 Six Wheeler - 20001
McLaren M23 - 20002
Porsche 928 - 20003
Team Lotus J.P.S.Mk.III - 20004
Martini Porsche 935 Turbo - 20005
Wolf WR-1 Ford - 20006
Brabham BT46 Alfa Romeo - 20007
Porsche 935 Turbo - 20008
Toyota Celica LB Turbo Gr.5 - 20009
Ferrari F312T3 - 20010
Racing Pit Team - 20011
Ligier JS11 Ford - 20012
Fiat 131 Abarth Rally - 20013
Williams FW-07 - 20014
Fiat 131 Monte-Carlo Winner - 20015
Porsche 928S - 20016
Brabham BT50 BMW Turbo - 20017
Renault RE-30B Turbo - 20018
Williams FW-11 Honda - 20019
Lotus Honda 99T - 20020
Benetton Ford B188 - 20021
McLaren MP4/4 - 20022
Ferrari F189 Early Version - 20023
Ferrari F189 Portuguese G.P. - 20024
Williams FW13B - 20025
McLaren MP4/5B - 20026
Driver & Tech. Engineer Set - 20027
Leyton House CG901B - 20028
Braun Tyrrell Honda 020 - 20029
Lotus Type 102B - 20030
Tyre Changing Pit Crew - 20031
Jordan 191 - 20032
Lotus Ford 102D (Herbert) - 20033
Lotus Ford 102D (Hakkinen) - 20034
McLaren MP4/7 - 20035
Benetton Ford B192 - 20036
Lotus 107 Ford - 20037
Lotus 107B Ford - 20038
McLaren MP4/8 - 20039
Newman Haas K Mart Texaco Lola T93/00 Ford - 20040
Dick Simon Duracell Mobil 1 Sadia Lola T93/00 Ford  - 20041
Tyrrell Yamaha 023 - 20042
Honda F1 RA272 - 20043
Lotus 25 Coventry Climax - 20044
Ferrari F310B - 20045
McLaren MP4/13 - 20046
McLaren MP4/13 Japanese GP - 20047
Ferrari F1-2000 - 20048
Ferrari F1-2000 (Clear Cowl)- 20049
Brabham BT-46 Alfa Romeo (Clear Cowl) - 20050
Ferrari 312T3 (Clear Cowl) - 20051
Ferrari F2001 - 20052
Tyrrell P34 1977 Monaco GP - 20053
Ferrari F2001 (Clear Cowl) - 20054
WilliamsF1 BMW FW24 - 20055
Full-View WilliamsF1 BMW FW24 Italian GP 2002 - 20056
Lotus 99T Honda - 20057
Tyrrell P34 Six Wheeler 1976 Japan GP (w/Photo-Etched Parts) - 20058
Ferrari F60 - 20059
Lotus Type 79 1978 - 20060
Lotus Type 79 1979 - 20061
McLaren M23 1976 - 20062
Motorsports Team Set (1970–1985) - 20063
Wolf WR1 1977 - 20064
Lotus 78 - 20065
Porsche 928 - 20066
Red Bull Racing RB6 - 20067
Ferrari SF70H - 20068

Solar powered models
Tamiya has a history of making educational kits, made especially a few solar powered models, but they have made a rare foray into licensed anime merchandising with the Solaemon-Go. The solar powered car was based on the real World Solar Car competitor which is based on the popular Doraemon manga, published by Tamiya's publishing partner, Shogakukan.

Motorcycles
Tamiya has an extensive line of 1/12 scale street and Grand Prix racing motorcycles. A few 1/6 scale kits have also been made. In order of manufacture the 1/12 scale models are:-

(Manufacturer, model, Tamiya production number)
 
Yamaha YZR500 Grand Prix Racer –          14001 *
Yamaha RZ250                    –         14002 *
Suzuki RGB500 Grand Prix Racer   –        14003 *
Yamaha RZ350                      –       14004 *
Yamaha Scooter Beluga 50           –      14005 *
Honda CB750F                        –     14006
Honda CB900F2 Bol d'Or               –    14007 *
Honda CB1100R                  –          14008 *
Suzuki RGB500 Team Gallina      –         14009 *
Suzuki GSX1100S Katana           –        14010
Honda CR250R Motocrosser          –       14011 *
Kawasaki KR1000F Endurance Racer   –      14012 *
Suzuki RM250 Motocrosser            –     14013 *
Honda RS1000 Endurance Racer         –    14014 *
Suzuki GSX750S                   –        14015 *
Honda CX500 Turbo               –         14016 *
Honda VT250F                     –        14017 *
Honda CR450R Motocrosser          –       14018 *
Ducati 900 Mike Hailwood Replica   –      14019 *
Suzuki GSX750 Police Bike           –     14020 *
Honda VF750F                         –    14021 *
Ducati 900 NCR Racer                  –   14022 *
Honda MVX250F                    –        14023 *
Suzuki RG250 Gamma                –       14024 *
Ducati 900SS                       –      14025 *
Kenny Roberts & the Yamaha YZR500   –     14026 *
Jumping Driver                       –    14027 *
Kawasaki KR500 Grand Prix Racer       –   14028 *
Suzuki RG250 Gamma Full Option  –         14029 *
Honda VT250F Integra             –        14030 *
Honda VF750F Fully Cowl           –       14031 *
Honda NS500 Grand Prix Racer       –      14032 *
Racing Rider                        –     14033 *
Suzuki GSX750S New Katana            –    14034
Honda CBR400F                         –   14035
BMW K100                        –         14036 *
Yamaha RZV500R                   –        14037
Yamaha YZR500 (OW70)              –       14038 *
Honda CBR400F Endurance            –      14039
Straight Run Rider                  –     14040 *
Starting Rider                       –    14041 *
Honda NS500 With Starting Rider       –   14042 *
Yamaha YZR500 (OW70)& Straight Run Rider – 14043 *
Yamaha XV1000 Virago                     14044
Kawasaki GPZ400R               –          14045
KTM250 Motocrosser              –         14046 *
Yamaha FZ250 Phazer              –        14047 *
Yamaha SRX-6                      –       14048
BMW R80 G/S '85 Paris Dakar Rally Winner – 14049 *
Honda NS500 With Racing Figure     –      14050 *
KTM250MX With Motocross Rider     –       14051 *
Yamaha XV1000 Virago With Touring Rider – 14052 *
Suzuki RG250 Gamma Walter Wolf Version  – 14053 *
Honda NXR750 86 Paris Dakar Rally Winner – 14054 *
Honda NSR500 Grand Prix Racer     –       14055 *
BMW R80 G/S With Paris Dakar Rider –      14056 *
Honda VFR750R                       –     14057
Yamaha FZR750R (0W01)                –    14058
Honda NSR250 Repsol                   –   14059
Honda NR                               –  14060
Cup Noodle Honda NSR250            –      14061
Bimota Tesi 1D 906SR                –     14062
Ducati 888 Superbike Racer           –    14063*
Yamaha TZ250M (T Harada's 93 GP-2 Bike) – 14064
Suzuki GSX1100S Katana Custom Tuned   –   14065
Honda CB750F Custom Tuned    –            14066
'94 Yamaha TZ250M             –           14067
Ducati 916                     –          14068 *
Moto Guzzi V10 Centauro         –         14069
Honda CDR1100XX Super Blackbird  –        14070
Repsol Honda NSR500 '98           –       14071
Moviestar Honda Pons NSR500 '98    –      14072
Yamaha YZF-R1                       –     14073
Yamaha YZF-R1 Taira Racing           –    14074
Yamaha YZR500 (OW70) Taira Version    –   14075
Red Bull Yamaha WCM YZR500 '99    –       14076
Repsol Honda '99                   –      14077
Antena 3 Yamaha D'Antin YZR500      –     14078
Honda CBR1100XX Super Blackbird "With Me" – 14079 *
Yamaha XV1600 Road Star         –         14080
Suzuki RGv Gamma (XR89)          –        14081
Nastro Azzurzo Honda NSR500       –       14082
Telefónica Movistar Suzuki RGV '00 –      14083 *
Kawasaki Ninja ZX-12R               –     14084
"Full View" Yamaha YZF-R1 Taira Racing –  14085 *
Tech 3 Yamaha YZR500 '01         –        14086
Honda Pons NSR500 '01             –       14087 *
Factory Yamaha YZR500 '01          –      14088
Telefónica Movistar Suzuki RGv Gamma '01 – 14089
Suzuki Hayabusa 1300 (GSX 1300R)   –      14090
Antena 3 Yamaha D'Antin YZR500 '02  –     14091
Repsol Honda RC211V                  –    14092
Yoshimura Hayabusa X-1                –   14093
Telefónica Movistar Honda RC211V '03   –  14094
Team Honda Pons RC211V '03       –        14095
Repsol Honda RC211V '03           –       14096
Repsol Honda RC211V '03 Valencia   –      14097
Yamaha YZR-M1 '04 (No.46/No.47)     –     14098
Repsol Honda RC211V '03              –    14099
Yamaha YZR-M1 No.7/33                 –   14100
Ducati Desmosedici  -                     14101
Akai Yamaha YZR 500 –                     14102
Dantin Pramac Ducati GP4 - 14103
Yamaha YZR-M1 50th Anniversary U.S. Intercoloring Edition - 14104
Yamaha YZR-M1 50th Anniversary Valencia Edition – 14105
Repsol Honda RC211V 06 – 14106
Konica Minolta Honda RC211V - 14107
LCR Honda RC211 V´06 – 14108
Kawasaki Ninja ZX-RR – 14109
Ajinomoto Honda NSR 250 – 14110
Kawasaki ZZR 1400 – 14111
Kawasaki Ninja ZX-14 Special Color Edition – 14112
Honda RC166 GP Racer – 14113
Yamaha YZR-M1 50th Anniversary U.S Intercoloring Edition No.46 – 14114
Yamaha YZR-M1 50th Anniversary Valencia Edition No.46 – 14115
Yamaha YZR-M1 ´05 No.46/No.5 – 14116
Yamaha YZR-m1 ´09 Fiat Yamaha Team – 14117
Valentino Rossi Figure – 14118
Yamaha YZR-M1 ´09 Monster Yamaha Tech 3 - 14119
Yamaha YZR-M1 ´09 Fiat Yamaha Team (Estoril Edition) – 14120
Honda NSR500 ´84 – 14121
Racing Rider – 14122
Straight Run Rider – 14123
Starting Rider – 14124
Honda NS500 ´84 – 14125
“Full-View” Honda NSR500 ´84 – 14126
“Full-View” Honda RC166 GP Racer – 14127
“Full-View” Yamaha YZR-M1 ´09 Fiat Yamaha Team – 14128
Ducati 1199 Panigale S – 14129
Repsol Honda RC213V ´14 -14130
Kawasaki Ninja H2R – 14131
Ducati 1199 Panigale S Tricolore – 14132
Yamaha YZF-R1M – 14133
Honda Monkey 125 – 14134
Yamaha XV1600 Road Star Custom – 14135
Kawasaki Ninja H2 Carbon - 14136
Street Rider - 14137
Honda CBR1000RR-R Fireblade SP - 14138
Suzuki GsX-RR-14139

NB: * = Discontinued from production.

Ships
Tamiya produces many naval ship models in 1/350 and 1/700 scale and in both full and waterline versions. Full versions offer full hulls whereas waterline versions have flat bottoms, representing only the portion seen above the waterline giving the impression that the ship is floating when placed on a surface, which is more convenient in creating dioramas. The majority of the kits in the 1/700 waterline series are WWII Imperial Japanese Navy ships but there are also kits of WWII ships from other countries such as Germany, Britain, and the United States. The 1/700 waterline series battleship U.S.S. Missouri is 386.5 mm (15.2 inches) long with 1/350 battleships twice as long. Other 1/350 ships include the Yamato, Musashi, Bismarck, Tirpitz, USS New Jersey, USS Enterprise, HMS Prince of Wales, and more recent additions mainly on WW2 Japanese warships such as the Tone, Mogami, Mikuma, Yukikaze, and I-400 submarine. In addition the series has a few modern vessels such as the vehicle transport ship Shimokita with a transparent deck to allow viewing of the loaded hovercraft, tanks and trucks inside.

Tamiya Racing Factory

Tamiya and their racing team, Tamiya Racing Factory (TRF), have evolved into one of the most successful racing teams on the electric scene of worldwide R/C racing over the last few years. They are most famous for their work in the field of 1/10 scale electric touring car racing.

In 1999, at the request of many Tamiya enthusiasts, Tamiya started work on a car made purely for racing to replace their aging, gear-driven TA03R-TRF and TA03F David Jun Edition cars. The car that resulted was the TRF414X (built in very small numbers), which evolved into the TRF414M, and then to the more popular TRF414M2 (and the budget-oriented TA04 series), all employing the then-novel twin-belt drivetrain layout, with the center layshaft mounted above the motor. The TRF team's reputation shot up after the 3rd IFMAR ISTC world championships in Mogale City, South Africa, in 2002. The Thai driver Surikarn Chaidajsuriya shocked the world by winning the world championships driving a modified Tamiya TRF414M. The car he used was eventually released to the public as the TRF414M-World Championship Replica, of which only 1500 were built making it one of the more desirable Tamiya kits from the last 5 years.

Since 2002 the TRF division has continuously been growing with an expanded team in Japan and worldwide. In late 2002 Tamiya released their third shaft driven car called TB Evolution III (or TB Evo3) which won the YamaYama Cup in Japan two months later, with Satoshi Maezumi at the wheel. On the European scene the Dane Steen Graversen, along with Surikarn Chaidajsuriya and team manager Kiyokazu Suzuki, managed to join the A-main of the big LRP Masters race in Germany during April 2003. Surikarn then won both the 23T stock and the Modified classes in the Thailand International Touring Car championships (TITC) using an updated TB Evo3. Surikarn's Evo3 was eventually released to the public as the limited-edition TB Evo3 Surikarn Edition (SE) to commemorate the victory. It features red anodized aluminum components, new upper arm mounts, titanium turnbuckles and screws, delrin differential halves, a thicker 3 mm carbon chassis, and a new one-way carbon gear brace. The TB Evo3 SE was eventually replaced with the TB Evo4 in the first half of 2004. The Evo4 addressed the Evo3 owner's complaints about their car's bevel gear durability by incorporating a three-piece center shaft design, doing away with the Evo3's single-piece center shaft. The Evo4 was also equipped with Tamiya's lightweight reversible suspension set, incorporating smaller wheel bearings, stiffer material and reversible longer suspension arms which allows more cornering speed and more precise adjustment of the car's suspension characteristics.

The same year Tamiya discovered a new young star, a boy named Marc Rheinard from Germany. Rheinard debuted at the indoor race DHI Cup of 2004 with Tamiya's new belt driven car (designed in conjunction with Tech Racing) the TRF415. He and Steen Graversen finished 2nd and 3rd, proving the capability of this newly designed chassis. Two months later Rheinard won the LRP Masters world's best drivers. Things looked good for the upcoming 4th World Championships in Florida, USA. Few believed that Rheinard would actually win the world championships at the age of 17, but he did. Tamiya took their new and improved version of TRF415, the TRF415MS which stands for Maezumi Satoshi, one of the car's designers and a Tamiya factory driver. The new car had improved handling characteristics on asphalt through the adoption of a thinner chassis and the Evo4's lightweight reversible suspension. Rheinard took pole position and won two of the three A-mains. The other Tamiya driver in the top ten was former world champion Surikarn, driving the TB Evo4, who finished 9th.

After the 2004 World Championship Tamiya released the upgrade kit for the 415 containing the direct center pulley (as opposed to the center one-way included in the standard 415 and 415MS kits) and narrowed suspension mounts, further improving the 415 handling and acceleration. In early 2005 Tamiya released an updated version of the TB Evo4, called the TB Evo4MS. The Evo4MS was equipped with one-piece aluminium bulkheads (as opposed to the Evo4's  4-piece bulkhead), aluminium center brace and one-piece center shaft input cups (as opposed to plastic ones in the Evo4).

In July 2005 Tamiya further updated the TRF415MS by releasing the TRF415MSX. They released both as a conversion kit (for older 415s) and as a complete kit. The design featured a three-piece bulkhead for easy maintenance, a lowered and shortened upper deck that runs under the belt, and the removal of the middle decks — all of which contributed to a lower center of gravity and an increased "tweak" resistance. Marc won the World's Warm-Up in April 2006 with a revised version of the MSX sporting a new set of lowered rear bulkheads, shock towers, and steering mechanism. Unfortunately he only placed 4th overall in the 5th IFMAR ISTC World Championships held in August 2006 in Collegno, Italy, but his car was eventually released to the public as the limited-edition, asphalt-racing TRF415MSX Marc Rheinard Edition (MRE) in August 2006. It incorporated new alternated (having more widely spaced teeth) pulleys, a new lightweight delrin solid front axle, new internal drive ratios (through the adoption of the new pulleys), and the new steering mechanism. In July 2006 Tamiya released the TB Evolution 5, their next-generation gear-driven touring car, replacing the Evo4 MS. The Evo5 did away with the Evo4's front main shaft input cup, using a CV joint instead (but retaining a rear input cup), and also incorporates the new short arms for the lightweight suspension, which further increased the cornering speed and helped sharpen the car's turn-in. It was also equipped with a new, more precise steering mechanism (seen also in the TRF415MSX MRE), and a lowered top deck. In November 2006 Tamiya ceased the production of the MRE and released the updated TRF415MSXX. This car returned to the standard front one-way differential (unlike the solid axle included in the MRE) and came with new thinner upper and lower decks (altering the chassis flex characteristics), and a new aluminum air scoop to help cool the motor.

Supplies and Tools

Tamiya manufactures acrylic and enamel-based modelling paints, sprays and painting pens. Tamiya manufactures supplies such as putty, solvent, and modelling tools. They also provide upkeep equipment for their RC models, such as grease for the working gear boxes, work tables, airbrush stands and turn tables.

Tamiya's paints, like all their products, are recognised as superior quality. Tamiya released a line of "weathering" kits which allow the user to easily and quickly give their models the impression they have been damaged, have rusted or have been through a long service life.

General-purpose simple-model construction sets
Tamiya also offers an extensive line of "sturdy plastic" basic construction sets (as one division of the GeniuSeries) for building very simple battery-powered "working" models, such as a mobile claw-lifter, bulldozer, fork lift, crawler-type vehicles with multiple tank-treads, and toy "robots"—all usually operated by an equally simple wired remote-control. (There is at least one high-end model with radio-control however.) While some of these model "kits" can be used alone or in combination to create other things as desired, the product line also features many small general-purpose sets of parts like various plates and beams, wheels and axles, pulleys, chain drives, various remote-controls, and link-style tank treads with sprockets, as well as several types of motors (some waterproof) and gearboxes (some with multiple speed/torque configurations)  In addition, some models also feature special parts like cams and flywheels.

Though the appearance of most of the parts themselves is somewhat similar to Lego Technic, the build process and end result is much more like Erector Set since parts are actually fastened together with bolts through an array of available mounting holes (or in some cases with preassigned screws or glue) rather than merely snap-fit; and finished models remain very skeletal, having no outer shell or hull. Although kit-instructions even show steps at the level of gearbox and controller assembly, on at least some models some structural and/or non-structural parts are actually made of pre-drilled wood, and may need to be glued together; for example the wooden main base-plate of the #70108 Tracked Vehicle Chassis Kit

The wired remote-control is generally at most 2+1 "channels" and controls 2 independent motors for driving (thus permitting standard 8-direction movement: F, FL, FR, B, BL, BR, CW, CCW) plus 1 motor for operating a feature such as the claw-arm of the mobile claw-lifter (though claw-grip is alas mechanically rigged to arm position.)

Overall, Tamiya models should be somewhat sturdier than equivalent Erector Set models due to their thicker parts, and both should be sturdier than Lego Technic due to their physical fastenings rather than simple snap-fit, but both Erector Set and Lego Technic are much more flexible thanks to their complete lack of single-purpose part-joining points, self-tapping screws, and the need to glue parts.

Other
In the 1980s Tamiya introduced a Programmable logic controller for their moving models. It used the TMS1100 4-bit Microcontroller. developed by TI.

References

Notes
田宮俊作著『田宮模型をつくった人々』文藝春秋刊 2004年9月発行　

Tamiya product lines